Micropentila bunyoro is a butterfly in the family Lycaenidae. It is found in Uganda, the Democratic Republic of the Congo (North Kivu) and north-western Tanzania. The habitat consists of primary forests.

References

Butterflies described in 1965
Poritiinae